Mazilug is a rural locality (a village) in Torbeyevsky District of the Republic of Mordovia, Russia.  It is in administrative jurisdiction of the urban-type settlement of Torbeyevo and is located within  of it.  Population is mostly Mordovian.

References
 (State Assembly of the Republic of Mordovia. Administrative-Territorial Division as of October 1, 1997.  Saransk, 1998)

Rural localities in Mordovia
Torbeyevsky District